Further Mathematics is the title given to a number of advanced secondary mathematics courses. The term "Higher and Further Mathematics", and the term "Advanced Level Mathematics", may also refer to any of several advanced mathematics courses at many institutions.

In the United Kingdom, Further Mathematics describes a course studied in addition to the standard mathematics AS-Level and A-Level courses. In the state of Victoria in Australia, it describes a course delivered as part of the Victorian Certificate of Education (see § Australia (Victoria) for a more detailed explanation). Globally, it describes a course studied in addition to GCE AS-Level and A-Level Mathematics, or one which is delivered as part of the International Baccalaureate Diploma.

United Kingdom

Background
A qualification in Further Mathematics involves studying both pure and applied modules. Whilst the pure modules (formerly known as Pure 4–6 or Core 4–6, now known as Further Pure 1–3, where 4 exists for the AQA board) build on knowledge from the core mathematics modules, the applied modules may start from first principles.

The structure of the qualification varies between exam boards.

With regard to Mathematics degrees, most universities do not require Further Mathematics, and may incorporate foundation math modules or offer "catch-up" classes covering any additional content. Exceptions are the University of Warwick, the University of Cambridge which requires Further Mathematics to at least AS level; University College London requires or recommends an A2 in Further Maths for its maths courses; Imperial College requires an A in A level Further Maths, while other universities may recommend it or may promise lower offers in return. Some schools and colleges may not offer Further mathematics, but online resources are available 
Although the subject has about 60% of its cohort obtaining "A" grades, students choosing the subject are assumed to be more proficient in mathematics, and there is much more overlap of topics compared to base mathematics courses at A level.

Some medicine courses do not count maths and further maths as separate subjects for the purposes of making offers. This is due to the overlap in content, and the potentially narrow education a candidate with maths, further maths and just one other subject may have.

The IGCSE equivalent of GCSE Further Maths is IGCSE Additional Mathematics.

Support 
There are numerous sources of support for both teachers and students. The AMSP (formerly FMSP) is a government-funded organisation that offers professional development, enrichment activities and is a source of additional materials via its website. Registering with AMSP gives access to Integral, another source of both teaching and learning materials hosted by Mathematics Education Innovation (MEI). Underground Mathematics is another resource in active development which reflects the emphasis on problem solving and reasoning in the UK curriculum. A collection of tasks for post-16 mathematics can be also found on the NRICH site.

Australia (Victoria)
In contrast with other Further Mathematics courses, Further Maths as part of the VCE is the easiest level of mathematics. Any student wishing to undertake tertiary studies in areas such as Science, Engineering, Commerce, Economics and some Information Technology courses must undertake one or both of the other two VCE maths subjects— Mathematical Methods or Specialist Mathematics. The Further Mathematics syllabus in VCE consists of three core modules, which all students undertake, plus two modules chosen by the student (or usually by the school or teacher) from a list of four. The core modules are Univariate Data, Bivariate Data, Time Series, Number Patterns and Business-Related Mathematics. The optional modules are Geometry and Trigonometry, Graphs and Relations, Networks and Decision Mathematics, or Matrices.

Singapore
Further Mathematics is available as a second and higher mathematics course at A Level (now H2), in addition to the Mathematics course at A Level. Students can pursue this subject if they have A2 and better in 'O' Level Mathematics and Additional Mathematics, depending on the school. Some topics covered in this course include mathematical induction, complex number, polar curve and conic sections, differential equations, recurrence relations, matrices and linear spaces, numerical methods, random variables and hypothesis testing and confidence intervals.

International Baccalaureate Diploma
Further Mathematics, as studied within the International Baccalaureate Diploma Programme, was a Higher Level (HL) course that could be taken in conjunction with Mathematics HL or on its own. It consisted of studying all four of the options in Mathematics HL, plus two additional topics.

Topics studied in Further Mathematics included:
Topic 1 - Linear algebra - studies on matrices, vector spaces, linear and geometric transformations
Topic 2 - Geometry - closer look on triangles, circles and conic sections
Topic 3 - Statistics and probability - the geometric and negative binomial distributions, unbiased estimators, statistical hypothesis testing and an introduction to bivariate distributions
Topic 4 - Sets, relations and groups - algebra of sets, ordered pairs, binary operations and group homomorphism
Topic 5 - Calculus - infinite sequences and series, limits, improper integrals and various first-order ordinary differential equations
Topic 6 - Discrete mathematics - complete mathematical induction, linear Diophantine equations, Fermat's little theorem, route inspection problem and recurrence relations

From 2019, the course has been discontinued and transited info the followings modules:

 Mathematics: analysis and approaches SL
 Mathematics: analysis and approaches HL
 Mathematics: applications and interpretation SL
 Mathematics: applications and interpretation HL

India 
CBSE does not include any 'further' mathematics courses. While the JEE Advanced syllabus is a slightly extended variant of the CBSE Class 11 and 12 syllabus, that is not a school-leaving examination.

See also 
 Additional Mathematics
Advanced level mathematics

References

External links
The Further Mathematics Support Programme
Mechanics M1 Material
AMSP (Advanced Math Support Program)
Integral (High level support for AS/A level Maths & Further Maths)
Underground Mathematics (Resources on A level mathematics)

Mathematics education